Brian Battease (born September 11, 1983 in Japan) is a professional boxer.

In 1989, Battease moved to Wahiawā, Hawai'i and began boxing. Battease became a six-time state champion during his amateur career, leading to a 3rd-place finish at Golden Gloves nationals in 2005.

Professional career
Battease moved to Las Vegas, Nevada to turn professional. Battease remained undefeated until his seventh fight vs Dustin Day. After Battease landed a vicious combination that caused Dustin Day to put his hand on the canvas, referee Kenny Bayless did not score it a knockdown. Battease still received 38–37 score from Al Lefkowitz but judges C. J. Roth and Jerry Ross scored the bout in favor of Day, 38–37.

Battease responded with a convincing unanimous decision victory over Isaac Hidalgo, improving his professional record to 5–1.

References

1983 births
Living people
Sportspeople from Honolulu
Boxers from Nevada
American male boxers